The Old Guntersville Post Office is a historic U.S. Post Office in Guntersville, Alabama. It was built in 1940–41 with federal Treasury Department funds in Colonial Revival style.  The building houses a painting by Charles Russell Hardman.  The Guntersville Post Office was added to the National Register of Historic Places on August 16, 2010.

References

National Register of Historic Places in Marshall County, Alabama
Post office buildings on the National Register of Historic Places in Alabama
Buildings and structures in Marshall County, Alabama